Guachucal is a town and municipality in the Nariño Department, Colombia.

See also
List of highest towns by country

References

Municipalities of Nariño Department